Tom Hicks (born 25 October 1991) is an English professional rugby union player who plays for Doncaster Knights  in the RFU Championship.

Originally part of the Northampton Saints academy, Hicks signed for Gloucester Rugby on 7 June 2013. On 24 April 2015, Hicks officially signed a senior deal with Gloucester. On 8 May 2016, Hicks joins RFU Championship side Rotherham Titans from the 2016-17 season. On 11 April 2017, Hicks signed for Championship rivals Doncaster Knights ahead of the 2017-18 season.

References

External links
Gloucester Rugby Profile

Living people
1991 births
English rugby union players
Gloucester Rugby players
Sportspeople from Rhineland-Palatinate
Sportspeople from Gloucestershire
Rugby union locks